Kathputli is a 1957 Pygmalion Black-and-white Hindi-language film produced by Ajit Chakraborty and Amiya Chakrabarty with their Sreerangam Productions. The film was the last film of director Amiya Chakrabarty, who had earlier directed Basant, Daag and Seema. He died during the filming and Nitin Bose took up the mantle of director in the film. The film stars Vyjayanthimala and Balraj Sahni in the lead with Jawahar Kaul, Agha, Kumari Kamala, C. S. Dubey, Sheela Kashmiri, Poonam and Laxman Rao, forming an ensemble cast. The film's music was composed by the Shankar Jaikishan duo, with the lyrics by Shailendra and Hasrat Jaipuri.

Plot
The film's story is about young Pushpa, an accomplished dancer and singer, who assists puppeteer Shivraj in his puppet show. Pushpa comes from a poor family, and is a good dancer and singer. She would like to assist a puppeteer with his makeshift dolls and puppet act. Unfortunately, he meets with an accident, and is hospitalized. Some of his puppets were also damaged during this accident. Pushpa approaches Loknath for work, and he gets her to work on stage, and would like her to become a movie star. Will Pushpa give up her simple life, and take on the glamorous route? It dealt with the theme of a godfather trying to control his protégé.

Cast
 Vyjayanthimala as Pushpa
 Balraj Sahni as Loknath
 Kamala Laxman as Kamala
 Jawahar Kaul as Shivraj
 Sheela Kashmiri as Chandni, Pushpa's younger sister
 C. S. Dube
 Laxman Rao
 Jharna
 Punam
 Jagat Pal	
 Shyam Kumar
 Robert
 Vijay
Agha as Manohar

Soundtrack

The film's soundtrack was composed by the Shankar Jaikishan duo, with the lyrics by Shailendra and Hasrat Jaipuri. The soundtrack was a hit among the audience.

References

External links
 
 Kathputli profile at Upperstall.com

1957 films
1950s Hindi-language films
1950s Urdu-language films
Films scored by Shankar–Jaikishan
1950s multilingual films
Indian multilingual films